Hugh Cleghorn may refer to:

 Hugh Cleghorn (colonial administrator) (1752–1837), first colonial secretary to Ceylon
 Hugh Cleghorn (forester) (1820–1895), Scottish physician, botanist, forester and land owner

See also
 Hugh Clegg (disambiguation)